The Lake Geneva Museum (Musée du Léman) is located in Nyon, Switzerland. It was founded in 1954, and was created for the many artifacts found in the lake, such as shipwrecks, models, and engines. It also contains aquariums with images of wildlife.

Collections

Surface 

1 000 m² of permanent and temporary expositions, not taking into account administrative and technical premises, as well as a shelter for cultural assets and a depot for the museum collections.

Visitors 

In 2011, about 21,600 visitors. Аpproximately 700,000 since 1975.

External links

Notes

Nyon
Museums in the canton of Vaud
History museums in Switzerland
Natural history museums in Switzerland
Aquaria in Switzerland
Maritime museums